The bamboo leaf aphid (Astegopteryx bambusae) is an aphid in the superfamily Aphidoidea in the order Hemiptera. It is a true bug and sucks sap from plants. It is similar to Astegopteryx bambucifoliae.

Host plant
The major host is Bambusa arundinacea Willd.

References 

 http://animaldiversity.org/accounts/Astegopteryx_bambusae/classification/
 http://www.nbair.res.in/Aphids/Astegopteryx-bambusae.php
 http://aphid.speciesfile.org/Common/basic/Taxa.aspx?TaxonNameID=1162641

Hormaphidinae
Agricultural pest insects
Hemiptera of Asia